Lafayette Blue Springs State Park is a Florida State Park, located on the west side of the Suwannee River, seven miles northwest of Mayo, off US 27. It contains one of the state's 33 first magnitude springs, with a daily discharge of up to 168 million gallons.

Fauna
Many animals live in and around the park. Among the mammals found there are white-tailed deer and gray squirrel. Reptiles that have been seen are the, alligator, eastern glass lizard, as well as gulf hammock rat, red-bellied, rough green and coral snakes.

Bird sightings in the park have included barred owls, cardinals, doves, eagles, flycatchers, red-shouldered hawks, kites, sparrows, swifts, thrushes, warblers, waxwings, pileated woodpeckers, and wrens.

Recreational Activities
The park has such amenities as boating, canoeing, fishing, hiking, kayaking, picnicking areas, scuba diving, snorkeling, swimming, and wildlife viewing. It also has primitive camping and restroom facilities.

Hours
Florida state parks are open between 8 a.m. and sundown every day of the year (including holidays).

Gallery

References and external links
 Lafayette Blue Springs State Park at Florida State Parks

State parks of Florida
Parks in Lafayette County, Florida
Springs of Florida
Bodies of water of Lafayette County, Florida